Penthea intricata is a species of beetle in the family Cerambycidae. It was described by Francis Polkinghorne Pascoe in 1864. It is known to be from Australia.

References

Pteropliini
Beetles described in 1864